Pitfall may refer to:

Hazard
Trapping pit, a large pit dug to catch animals
Pitfall trap, a small pit dug to catch amphibians, insects and reptiles

Film and television
 Pitfalls, 1914 film with Edwin August, produced by Pat Powers
 Pitfall (1948 film), directed by Andre DeToth
 Pitfall (1962 film), directed by Hiroshi Teshigahara
 The Pitfall (1989 film), a Swedish film
 Pitfall (game show), hosted by Alex Trebek
 "Pitfall", a 1965 episode of season 12 of Lassie

Video games
 Pitfall!, the 1982 original game
 Pitfall! (2012 video game), a sequel to the 1982 game

Music 
Pitfalls, a 2019 album by Norwegian progressive music band Leprous
"Pitfall", on the 1956 release Marty Paich Quartet featuring Art Pepper by Bill Pitman
"Pitfalls", song by Film School on Film School (album)
"Pitfalls", song on Industry (Richard Thompson and Danny Thompson album) 1997